Marknesse is a village in the Dutch province of Flevoland.

History 
Marknesse was first mentioned in 1950 as Marknesse, and is a combination of border land and headland. It has been named after a flooded village near Urk.

The village was founded in 1946 as B. In 1943, temporary barracks were built to polder the Noordoostpolder. The village has a green central axis with the Dutch Reformed Church in one corner and the Reformed Church on the other side, and the flanks contain shops. Most of the houses are oriented north–south.

After the merger of the two Reformed Churches into the Protestant Church, it was decided to demolish the Dutch Reformed church and replace it with a five-story apartment building. One of the original wooden barracks is still present. It was supposed to be transformed into residential houses, but is currently in use as a cultural centre.

Gallery

Climate

References

External links 

Populated places in Flevoland
Noordoostpolder
1946 establishments in the Netherlands